Hong Hai Er is the Chinese name of Red Boy, a character in the Chinese classical novel Journey to the West. It may also refer to:

 Hong Hai Er (band), a Taiwanese boy band in the 1990s.
 Films:
 Hong Hai Er (1928 film), a 1928 Chinese film directed by Gu Wuwei and starring Gu Baolian.
 The Fantastic Magic Baby, a 1975 Hong Kong film.
 Fire Ball (2005 film), a 2005 Taiwanese animated film from Wang Film Productions.